Alkalihalobacillus is a genus of gram-positive or gram-variable rod-shaped bacteria in the family Bacillaceae from the order Bacillales. The type species of this genus is Alkalihalobacillus alcalophilus. 

This genus comprises species formerly belonging to the genus Bacillus, a genus that has been recognized as displaying extensive polyphyly and phylogenetic heterogeneity due to the vague criteria (such as the ability to form endospores in the presence of oxygen) previously used to assign species to this clade. Multiple studies using comparative phylogenetic analyses have been published in an attempt to clarify the evolutionary relationships between Bacillus species, resulting in the establishment of numerous novel genera such as Alkalihalobacillus, Brevibacillus, Solibacillus, Alicyclobacillus and Virgibacillus. The genus Bacillus is now restricted to species closely related to Bacillus subtilis and Bacillus cereus.

The name Alkalihalobacillus is composed of the prefix "alkali-" (from the Arabic article and noun al galiy, which translates to 'the ashes of saltwort'), the prefix "halo-" (from the Greek noun hals/halos, meaning salt) and suffixed by "-bacillus" (from the Latin noun bacillus, referring to 'a small staff or rod' and Bacillus, a bacterial genus). Together, the name refers to bacillus living in salty or alkaline conditions, or salty and alkaline conditions.

Taxonomy 
This genus, as of May 2021, contains a total of 44 species, 39 of which have been validly published and have established names. This genus was identified as a monophyletic clade and phylogenetically unrelated to other Bacillus species in studies examining the taxonomic relationships within Bacillus. This branching pattern is also observed in the Genome Taxonomy Database (GTDB).

Two additional Bacillus species (Bacillus alcaliphilum and Bacillus alkalisoli) are found to group with other members of Alkalihalobacillus in phylogenetic trees as well as share the same molecular markers in the form of conserved signature indels (CSIs). However, their transfer was not officially proposed due to the lack of culture strain information. Further revision of this genus is required as additional genomes and novel species are discovered and assigned.

Accepted species 

 Alkalihalobacillus akibai
 Alkalihalobacillus alcalophilus
 Alkalihalobacillus algicola
 Alkalihalobacillus alkalilacus
 Alkalihalobacillus alkalinitrilicus
 Alkalihalobacillus alkalisediminis
 Alkalihalobacillus berkeleyi
 Alkalihalobacillus bogoriensis
 Alkalihalobacillus caeni
 Alkalihalobacillus clausii
 Alkalihalobacillus decolorationis
 Alkalihalobacillus gibsonii
 Alkalihalobacillus halodurans
 Alkalihalobacillus hemicellulosilyticus
 Alkalihalobacillus hemicentroti
 Alkalihalobacillus hunanensis
 Alkalihalobacillus hwajinpoensis
 Alkalihalobacillus kiskunsagensis
 Alkalihalobacillus krulwichiae
 Alkalihalobacillus ligniniphilus
 Alkalihalobacillus lindianensis
 Alkalihalobacillus lonarensis
 Alkalihalobacillus macyae
 Alkalihalobacillus marmarensis
 Alkalihalobacillus miscanthi
 Alkalihalobacillus murimartini
 Alkalihalobacillus nanhaiisediminis
 Alkalihalobacillus oceani
 Alkalihalobacillus okhensis
 Alkalihalobacillus okuhidensis
 Alkalihalobacillus oshimensis
 Alkalihalobacillus patagoniensis
 Alkalihalobacillus pseudalcaliphilus
 Alkalihalobacillus pseudofirmus
 Alkalihalobacillus shaceensis
 Alkalihalobacillus trypoxylicola
 Alkalihalobacillus urbisdiaboli
 Alkalihalobacillus wakoensis
 Alkalihalobacillus xiaosiensis

Biochemical characteristics and molecular signatures 
Most members of this genus are aerobic or facultatively anaerobic and are found in diverse locations such as hypersaline lakes, coastal regions and soil. All species, with the exception of Alkalihalobacillus okhensis, are able to produce endospores. Motility is variable, with some species possessing peritrichous flagella. The majority of species from this genus are alkaliphilic and halophilic/tolerant, and thus they are able to grow in alkaline conditions, with the optimal growth rate being in the pH range of 9-10 with 1-5% NaCl. Some species are obligately alkaliphilic and require very alkaline conditions to survive. A wide range of temperature (4-45 °C) can be conducive to growth; however, optimal growth occurs in the range of 25-37°C. Some species are able to produce enzymes such as cellulases and proteases, which are used in laundry detergent manufacturing, xylanases for the pulp paper sector and cyclodextrin glucanotransferase for starch treatment. In addition, A. clausii is diazotrophic and able to convert atmospheric nitrogen into ammonia and it is also able to produce antimicrobial compounds for the manufacturing of probiotic.

Through genomic analysis, ten CSIs have been identified for this genus in the following proteins: RNase adapter RapZ, flagellar basal body M-ring protein FliF, 7-carboxy-7-deazaguanine synthase QueE, peptide chain release factor 3, type I glutamate-ammonia ligase, tRNA threonyl-carbamoyladenosine dehydratase, transcription-repair coupling factor, tRNA uridine-5- carboxymethylaminomethyl (34) synthesis enzyme MnmG, 50S ribosomal protein L11 methyltransferase, and homoserine kinase. These CSIs are specific for Alkalihalobacillus and provide a novel way to molecularly differentiate this genus from other Bacillaceae genera and bacteria.

References 

Bacteria genera
Bacillaceae